The 2nd Utah Territorial Legislature convened on December 13, 1852, and ended on January 21, 1853.

Members

References

02